Renfro is an unincorporated community in Moniteau County, in the U.S. state of Missouri.

History
A post office called Renfro was established in 1899, and remained in operation until 1907. The community derives its name from James P. Renfrow, the proprietor of a local mill.

References

Unincorporated communities in Moniteau County, Missouri
Unincorporated communities in Missouri
Jefferson City metropolitan area